Franciszek Lacki or Franciszek Lanczki (1562–1617) was a Roman Catholic prelate who served as Auxiliary Bishop of Włocławek (1597–1617) and Titular Bishop of Margarita (1597–1617).

Biography
Franciszek Lacki was born in 1562.
On 15 Sep 1597, he was appointed during the papacy of Pope Clement VIII as Auxiliary Bishop of Włocławek and Titular Bishop of Margarita.
On 24 Aug 1598, he was consecrated bishop by Stanisław Rozrażewski, Bishop of Włocławek, with Jan Gniasdowski, Titular Bishop of Teodosia, and Jan Zamoyski (bishop), Titular Bishop of Philippi, serving as co-consecrators.
He served as Auxiliary Bishop of Włocławek until his death on 19 Jan 1617.

While bishop, he was the principal co-consecrator of: Jerzy Zamoyski, Bishop of Chełm (1601); Jan Kuczborski, Bishop of Chelmno (1614); and Stanislaw Starczewski, Titular Bishop of Lacedaemonia  and Auxiliary Bishop of Płock (1615).

References

External links and additional sources
 (for Chronology of Bishops) 
 (for Chronology of Bishops)  
 (for Chronology of Bishops) 
 (for Chronology of Bishops)  

17th-century Roman Catholic titular bishops
Bishops appointed by Pope Clement VIII
1562 births
1617 deaths